Çullu or Chullu or Chulalu may refer to:

 Çullu, Jabrayil, Azerbaijan
 Chullu, Charuymaq, East Azerbaijan Province, Iran
 Chulalu, Sarab, East Azerbaijan Province, Iran
 Chullu, now Collo, a Roman titular episcopal see
 Çullu, Quzanlı, a village in the Agdam District of Azerbaijan in the Quzanlı municipality
 Çullu Vtoroye, Agdam, a village in the Agdam District of Azerbaijan
 Çullu, Köprüköy